Aptosimum is a genus of flowering plants belonging to the family Scrophulariaceae.

Its native range is Dry Tropical and Southern Africa.

Species:

Aptosimum albomarginatum 
Aptosimum arenarium 
Aptosimum decumbens 
Aptosimum elongatum 
Aptosimum eriocephalum 
Aptosimum glandulosum 
Aptosimum gossweileri 
Aptosimum indivisum 
Aptosimum lineare 
Aptosimum marlothii 
Aptosimum molle 
Aptosimum neglectum 
Aptosimum patulum 
Aptosimum procumbens 
Aptosimum pumilum 
Aptosimum radiatum 
Aptosimum spinescens 
Aptosimum suberosum 
Aptosimum tragacanthoides 
Aptosimum transvaalense 
Aptosimum viscosum 
Aptosimum welwitschii

References

Scrophulariaceae
Scrophulariaceae genera